Karl Kondolf Bechtold (July 9, 1910 – June 13, 1970) was an American lawyer and politician from New York.

Life
He was born on July 9, 1910, in Rochester, New York, the son of Charles B. Bechtold and Kate (Kondolf) Bechtold. He attended Choate School. He graduated B.A. from Yale University in 1933, and LL.B. from Yale Law School in 1937.

Bechtold was a member of the New York State Senate (46th D.) from 1939 to 1942, sitting in the 162nd and 163rd New York State Legislatures. On August 29, 1942, he married Catherine (Haight) Fowler (died 1964), daughter of Justice Thomas Griffith Haight (1879–1942), and they had two daughters, Karyl Bechtold and Susan Bechtold. Susan died as an infant, Karyl has two children, Timothy Karl and Catharine Ann and 7 grandchildren.

In 1942, Bechtold joined the U.S. Navy and eventually became a lieutenant commander.

He died on June 13, 1970, at his home in Kennebunkport, Maine; and was buried at the Riverside Cemetery in Rochester.

Sources

1910 births
1970 deaths
Politicians from Rochester, New York
Republican Party New York (state) state senators
People from Kennebunkport, Maine
United States Navy officers
Choate Rosemary Hall alumni
Yale Law School alumni
20th-century American politicians
Lawyers from Rochester, New York
Military personnel from Rochester, New York
Yale University alumni
20th-century American lawyers
United States Navy personnel of World War II